Doughboy was a popular nickname for the American infantryman during World War I. Though the origins of the term are not certain, the nickname was still in use as of the early 1940s. Examples include the 1942 song "Johnny Doughboy Found a Rose in Ireland", recorded by Dennis Day, Kenny Baker, and Kay Kyser, among others, the 1942 musical film Johnny Doughboy, and the character "Johnny Doughboy" in Military Comics. It was gradually replaced during World War II by "G.I."

Etymology 
The origins of the term are unclear. The word was in wide circulation a century earlier in both Britain and America, albeit with different meanings. Horatio Nelson's sailors and the Duke of Wellington's soldiers in Spain, for instance, were both familiar with fried flour dumplings called "doughboys", the precursor of the modern doughnut. Independently, in the United States, the term had come to be applied to bakers' young apprentices, i.e., "dough-boys".  In Moby-Dick (1851), Herman Melville nicknamed the timorous cabin steward "Doughboy".

History 

Doughboy as applied to the infantry of the U.S. Army first appears in accounts of the Mexican–American War of 1846–1848, without any precedent that can be documented. A number of theories have been put forward to explain this usage:
 Cavalrymen used the term to deride foot soldiers, because the brass buttons on their uniforms looked like the flour dumplings or dough cakes called "doughboys", or because of the flour or pipe clay which the soldiers used to polish their white belts.
 Observers noticed U.S. infantry forces were constantly covered with chalky dust from marching through the dry terrain of northern Mexico, giving the men the appearance of unbaked dough or the mud bricks of the area known as adobe, with "adobe" transformed to 'dobies' and then further into "doughboy".
 The soldiers' method of cooking field rations of the 1840s and 1850s into doughy flour-and-rice concoctions baked in the ashes of a camp fire. This does not explain why only infantrymen received the appellation.

One explanation offered for the usage of the term in World War I is that female Salvation Army volunteers went to France to cook millions of doughnuts and bring them to the troops on the front line, although this explanation ignores the usage of the term in the earlier war. One joke explanation for the term's origin was that, in World War I, the doughboys were "kneaded" in 1914 but did not rise until 1917.

Average age
In World War I the doughboys were very young, often teenaged boys. The average age of a doughboy in World War I was less than 25 years old. Fifty-seven percent of the doughboys were under the age of 25. Seventeen-year-old boys also enlisted to fight in World War I.

Monuments and memorials 
A popular mass-produced sculpture of the 1920s called the Spirit of the American Doughboy shows a U.S. soldier in World War I uniform.

See also 

 Digger – equivalent for Australian and New Zealand soldiers, originated in World War I
 Poilu – equivalent term for French soldiers of World War I
 Tommy Atkins – equivalent term for British soldiers of World War I

References

Further reading  

 Faulstich, Edith. M. "The Siberian Sojourn" Yonkers, N.Y. (1972–1977)
 Gawne, Jonathan. Over There!: The American Soldier in World War I (1999)- 83 pages, heavily illustrated
 Grotelueschen, Mark Ethan. The AEF Way of War: The American Army and Combat in World War I (2006) excerpt and text search
 Gutièrrez, Edward A. Doughboys on the Great War: How American Soldiers Viewed Their Military Experience (2014)
 Hallas, James H. Doughboy War: The American Expeditionary Force in World War I (2nd ed. 2009) online edition; includes many primary sources from soldiers
 Hoff, Thomas. US Doughboy 1916-19 (2005)
 Kennedy, David M. Over Here: The First World War and American Society (1980)  excerpt and text search
 Nelson, James Carl. The Remains of Company D: A Story of the Great War (2009)
 Ranck, [Edwin] Carty. The Doughboys' Book (1925)
 Rubin, Richard The Last of the Doughboys: the forgotten generation and their forgotten world war  plus  online webcast presentation of book
 Schafer, Ronald. America in the Great War (1991)
 Skilman,  Willis Rowland. The A.E.F.: Who They Were, what They Did, how They Did it (1920) 231 pp;  full text online
 Smith, Gene. Until the Last Trumpet Sounds: The Life of General of the Armies John J. Pershing (1999), popular biography.
 Snell, Mark A. Unknown Soldiers: The American Expeditionary Forces in Memory and Remembrance (2008)
 Thomas, Shipley. The History of the A. E. F. (1920), 540pp;  full text online
 Votow, John. The American Expeditionary Forces in World War I (2005) - 96 pp;  excerpt and text search
 Werner, Bret. Uniforms, Equipment And Weapons of the American Expeditionary Forces in World War I (2006)
 Zieger, Robert. America's Great War: World War 1 and the American Experience (2000)

External links
 

 The Doughboy Center: The Story of the American Expeditionary Forces at Worldwar1.com

Infantry
Military slang and jargon